The Football Conference consists of the top two levels of Non-League football in England. The Conference Premier is the fifth highest level of the overall pyramid, whilst the Conference North and Conference South exist at the sixth level. The top team and the winner of the playoff of the National division will be promoted to Football League Two, while the bottom four will be relegated to the North or South divisions. The champions of the North and South divisions will be promoted to the National division, alongside the play-off winners from each division. The bottom three in each of the North and South divisions will be relegated to the premier divisions of the Northern Premier League, Isthmian League or Southern League For sponsorship reasons, the league is frequently referred to as the Blue Square Premier.

Conference Premier
A total of 24 teams contested the division, including 19 sides from last season, one relegated from the Football League Two, two promoted from the Conference North and two promoted from the Conference South.

Promotion and relegation
Teams promoted from 2006–07 Conference North
Droylsden
Farsley Celtic

Teams promoted from 2006–07 Conference South
Histon
Salisbury City

Teams relegated from 2006–07 League Two
Torquay United

Boston United were also relegated from the Football League, but were placed in the Conference North due to financial problems. Altrincham, who had finished in the relegation zone in the 2006–07 season, were reprieved in order for the division to remain at 24 teams.

Overall
Aldershot Town made a return to the Football League, Aldershot F.C. having actually folded during the league season of 1991–92 league season. Its successor Aldershot Town F.C., however, actually made an exceptionally bad start of the season, losing two of their first three home games, but after that they gained a form that produced Football Conference records, such as their 31 wins and the 101 points, wrapping up the title and the promotion well ahead of the end of the season. A key factor was their ability to avoid drawn matches, of which they only had eight. And even then six of them occurred during the nine games when they were wrapping up the title.

The play-offs saw local rivals Exeter City and Torquay United facing each other for a chance to play for a promotion to the Football League. Torquay had the upper hand at first, winning the first leg on Exeter's soil with 1–2, and they on home ground they were leading 1–0 (3–1 aggregate) with just 20 minutes left, when Exeter ended their hopes with a burst of four goals to wrap up the series with a 5–3 aggregate win. Exeter eventually won 1–0 over Cambridge United at Wembley to seal their return to the League.

As usual, the biggest average crowds were seen in Oxford, with an average of 4,728 spectators per game and an aggregate of 108,750, but actually they fell fifth in highest attendances, with the West Country derby between Exeter City and Torquay United drawing the biggest crowd of the season with 7,839 spectators, followed by the Cambridgeshire derby of Cambridge United v Histon with 7,125, another West Country derby between Torquay and Exeter with 6,021 and even Aldershot Town v Weymouth with 5,980, leaving Oxford behind in their top drawing match against Crawley Town with their 5,900 spectators. Droylsden had the fewest spectators, with an aggregate of 14,800, meaning an average crowd of 643 spectators, with a high of 1,178 against Altrincham.

League table

Locations

Results

Play-offs

Top scorers in order of league goals

Source:

Conference North

Promotion and relegation
A total of 22 teams contested the division, including 17 sides from last season, one relegated from Football League Two, two relegated from the Conference National and two promoted from the Northern Premier League.

Teams promoted from 2006–07 Northern Premier League Premier Division
 Burscough
 AFC Telford United

Teams relegated from 2006–07 Conference National
 Tamworth
 Southport

Teams relegated from 2006–07 League Two
 Boston United

Boston United were transferred down two divisions due to financial problems. At the end of the season still under entering administration, Boston United were relegated another division down.

League table

Locations

Results

Play-offs

Conference South

Promotion and relegation
A total of 22 teams contested the division, including 17 sides from last season, one relegated from the Conference National, two promoted from the Isthmian League and two promoted from the Southern Football League.

Teams promoted from 2006–07 Southern League Premier Division
 Bath City
 Maidenhead United

Teams promoted from 2006–07 Isthmian League Premier Division
 Hampton & Richmond Borough
 Bromley

Teams relegated from 2006–07 Conference National
 St Albans City

League table

Locations

Results

Play-offs

References

External links
Official Football Conference website

 
National League (English football) seasons
Eng
5